The Liberal Democratic Party (LDP) is a classical liberal party in Turkey. LDP was founded in 1994 as “Liberal Parti” by Turkish entrepreneur Besim Tibuk.

Tibuk was the advisor of Turkish President Turgut Özal until Özal died on 17 April 1993. After the death of Turgut Özal, Besim Tibuk decided to found a new party to emphasize the liberal movement in Turkey. Tibuk first founded the party as Liberal Party but then changed its name to "Liberal Democratic Party".

After the failure of his party in the 2002 general elections, Tibuk resigned. Cem Toker was the leader of LDP from 20 June 2005 to 29 January 2017. Since then, Gültekin Tırpancı has been the leader of the party.

According to data published in January 2021, the party has 5,227 members.

Policies

Presidential system 
Changing Turkey's parliamentary system, arguing that brought political instability advocate for the full US style presidential system based on the separation of powers. He also opposed the presidential system of the government on the grounds that it does not comply with the separation of powers. He also supported the "No!” vote in the 2017 Turkish constitutional referendum.

Party leaders

Turkish general elections performance

See also
 Classical liberalism
 Libertarianism
 Contributions to liberal theory
 Liberalism worldwide
 List of liberal parties
 Liberal democracy
 Liberalism in Turkey
 List of political parties in Turkey

References

External links
 Liberal Democratic Party official website
 Liberal Democratic Party Youtube page
 Liberal Democratic Party Twitter account

1994 establishments in Turkey
Centrist parties
Classical liberal parties
Liberal parties in Turkey
Political parties established in 1994
Political parties in Turkey
Pro-European political parties in Turkey